Jet Airways (India) Ltd is an Indian airline based in Delhi NCR, with a training and developmental center in Mumbai. Incorporated in April 1992 as a limited liability company, the airline began operations as an air taxi operator in 1993. It began full-fledged operations in 1995 with international flights added in 2004. The airline went public in 2005 and in 2007, when it acquired Air Sahara. Before the founding of Vistara in 2015, it was the only full-service airline based in India apart from Air India. The airline is expected to re-commence its flight operations by the end of 2023, making it the first Indian airline to be revived after ceasing operations.

It grew to be one of the largest airlines in India, with a 21.2% passenger market share in February 2016. It operated over 300 flights daily to 74 destinations worldwide from its erstwhile main hub at Chhatrapati Shivaji Maharaj International Airport in Mumbai and secondary hubs at Chennai International Airport in Chennai, Indira Gandhi International Airport in New Delhi, Kempegowda International Airport in Bengaluru, Cochin International Airport in Kochi and Netaji Subhas Chandra Bose International Airport in Kolkata. 

With its competitors, mainly SpiceJet and IndiGo, lowering ticket fares in the following years, it was forced to follow suit, hurting overall performance resulting in steep financial losses. It dropped to second place behind IndiGo in October 2017, with a passenger market share of 17.8%. The downward slide continued and resulted in bankruptcy in 2019. Jet Airways ceased operations in April 2019.

The company has announced plan to restart operations in early 2022. On the 29th anniversary of its founding on 5 May 2022, it performed a test flight, which is a step in obtaining an Air Operators Permit (AOP).

On 15 May 2022, Jet Airways conducted the first set of three proving flights by flying from Delhi-Mumbai, Mumbai-Ahmedabad, and Ahmedabad-Delhi routes using the aircraft VT-SXE. Jet Airways completed the final proving flight on 17 May 2022. 

As of August 2022, Kempegowda International Airport in Bangalore, Indira Gandhi International Airport in New Delhi and Chhatrapati Shivaji Maharaj International Airport in Mumbai will be the new operating hubs after the revival.

History
The airline was granted a scheduled airline status on 14 January 1995. It entered into a marketing agreement with KLM the same year. In 1996, the airline placed a $375 million order for four 737-400 and six 737-800 aircraft from Boeing, which were delivered between 1997 and 2000. Jet Airways was the first airline in Southeast Asia to order the 737-800. In the financial year 1996–97, the airline carried 2.4 million passengers and had a market share of 20 percent, second highest after state-owned Indian Airlines. By this time, the airline had a fleet of twelve Boeing 737 aircraft, operating 83 daily flights to 23 domestic destinations. In 1997, the Cabinet Committee on Foreign Investment (CCFI) of the Government of India announced that foreign airlines would no longer be permitted to take an equity stake in joint ventures with Indian aviation companies, reversing the Government's earlier policy which had allowed carriers such as Gulf Air, Kuwait Airways and Lufthansa to hold a maximum 40% equity stake in their joint ventures with Indian partners. In October 1997, as per this directive, Naresh Goyal took back control of Trade Winds from its foreign investors.

At the Paris Air Show in June 1999, Jet Airways announced an order worth approximately $550 million for ten Boeing 737-800 aircraft. The airline purchased its first Boeing 737-400 simulator from CAE Inc. in 2001.
By April 2001, the airline fleet had grown to 30 aircraft and was operating over 195 flights daily to 37 destinations within India. Jet Airways suffered losses for the first time since its establishment in financial year 2001–2002 as demand fell and costs increased. Jet Airways was announced as launch customer for the Embraer 175 at the Farnborough air show in 2002, with an order for ten aircraft and ten options worth $520 million. But the deal was postponed due to the airline's financial difficulties and eventually fell through. 
In 2003, the Indian government decided to allow private carriers to operate international services to countries in south Asia, such as Bangladesh, Nepal, and Sri Lanka.
 and Jet began preparations to launch international services.
The airline launched its first international flight in March 2004 from Chennai to Colombo.

Jet Airways was listed on the Bombay Stock Exchange and became a public company on 28 December 2004. After the Government lifted the foreign ownership limits on Indian airlines to 49% from the previous 40%, the airline moved to raise funds via an IPO. The company's IPO in February 2005, which offered 20% of the airline's stock, saw strong interest from investors leading to oversubscription in retail, non-institutional and institutional tranches and raised Rs 18.9 billion, instantly making Naresh Goyal a paper billionaire. Towards the end of 2004, the government had announced that privately owned scheduled carriers meeting certain criteria could operate to all countries apart from those in the Middle East. Then in January 2005, the Ministry of Civil Aviation granted rights to Jet Airways to operate services to London Heathrow. The airline started its first international, long-haul flight to London in May 2005 with two-class Airbus A340-300s sub-leased from South African Airways.

Growth and expansion
On 12 April 2007, the deal was back on track with Jet Airways agreeing to pay . On 16 April 2007, Air Sahara was renamed as JetLite and was marketed between a low-cost carrier and a full-service airline. JetLite became a wholly owned subsidiary of Jet Airways. In August 2008, Jet Airways announced its plans to integrate JetLite into Jet Airways. In October 2008, Jet Airways laid off 1,900 of its employees, who were later re-instated due to intervention from the Ministry of Civil Aviation. In October 2008, Jet Airways entered into an alliance with rival Kingfisher Airlines for code-sharing on domestic and international flights, collaboration on frequent-flyer program and sharing crew and ground handling equipment. On 8 May 2009, Jet Airways launched another low-cost brand, Jet Konnect. It operated a fleet of Boeing 737 Next Generation and ATR 72 aircraft and operated on profitable short-haul routes with higher passenger load factors.

Consolidation
In the third quarter of 2010, Jet Airways became the largest airline in India with a passenger market share of 22.6%. In July 2012, the airline officially sought government approval to join Star Alliance. Jet Airways is not a member of Star Alliance as of 2017. In June 2011, it became the first domestic airline in India to ban meat products and liquids in check-in baggage. Jet Airways merged the JetLite brand into Jet Konnect on 25 March 2012 and started offering business-class seats after the demise of Kingfisher Airlines. In 2013, Etihad Airways planned to buy a stake in the airline following the government's announcement in September 2012 that foreign airlines could take a stake of up to 49% in Indian carriers. The deal, which was expected to be signed in January 2013, was postponed and was completed on 12 November 2013.
Naresh Goyal retained 51% ownership of the stock.
In 2013, the airline lowered prices and entered into a fare war with low-cost carriers IndiGo and SpiceJet due to falling passenger demand. In February 2013, the airline's market value dropped by  due to falling share prices. Jet Airways made profits in the third quarter of the financial year 2013–14, after posting losses over the previous year. Jet Airways announced on 11 August 2014 that it would phase out Jet Konnect by the end of the year as part of plans to re-position itself as a uniform full-service operator. On 1 December 2014, Jet Konnect was fully merged with Jet Airways, making it the third full-service airline in India besides Air India and Vistara. In December 2015, Jet Airways announced the closure of its scissor hub at Brussels Airport by March 2016 and the opening of new hub at Amsterdam Schiphol Airport effective 27 March 2016. As of February 2016, it was the second-largest airline in India after IndiGo, with a 21.2% passenger-market share.

Bankruptcy and cessation of services
As of November 2018, Jet Airways has been reported to have a negative financial outlook due to increasing losses. In March 2019 it was reported that nearly a fourth of Jet Airways' aircraft were grounded due to unpaid lease rates. On 25 March 2019, Mr. Naresh Goyal and his wife Anitha Goyal stepped down from the board of directors.

On 5 April, Indian Oil Corporation stopped supplying fuel to the airline, citing non-payment of dues as the emergency funds have still not been credited. On 17 April, the airline suspended all flight operations, due to lenders rejecting Rs 4 billion of emergency funding and its membership in the International Air Transport Association (IATA) was suspended. On 17 June, after getting no acceptable offers from Etihad Airways and Hinduja Group, lenders to Jet Airways decided to refer the company to National Company Law Tribunal (NCLT) for bankruptcy proceedings with debt of $1.2 billion.

As the group faces insolvency proceedings in the Netherlands after failing to pay two creditors, NCLAT (National Company Law Appellate Tribunal) has allowed cross-border insolvency proceedings stating that the "Dutch Trustee (Administrator) will work in cooperation with the 'Resolution Professional of India."

In early 2020, Enso Group, tried to rescue the airline with Russian Far East Development Fund, and participated in talks for buying controlling stake in it from its committee of creditors(CoC), but talks fell through.

Restart
India's Jet Airways will resume flights in the first quarter of F.Y. 2022-23 after its creditors approved a bid from entrepreneur Murari Lal Jalan and asset management firm Kalrock, which is part of the Fritsch Group, an investment group founded by serial real estate and tech entrepreneur Florian Fritsch. Following this, on 22 June 2021, the NCLT approved the resolution put forward by Kalrock-Jalan consortium. In an oral order, the NCLT has given 90 days to the Ministry of Civil Aviation and the Directorate General of Civil Aviation for allotting airport slots to Jet Airways. Jet Airways-II could take to the skies next summer as a full service domestic airline with a fleet of six aircraft. Jet Airways took to the skies again on 6 May 2022 after a gap of three years. This was a testing flight to ensure the aircraft's safety. It received its Air Operator's Certificate on 20 May 2022.

"Jalan-Kalrock is in talks with aircraft OEMs (original equipment manufacturers) to place an order of at least 200 planes of mix small, medium and large narrow body jets at the Paris airshow in June for their growth plan for five years,"

Corporate affairs

Headquarters
The airline's new head office will be located in Delhi NCR. The office was earlier located at Siroya Centre in Andheri, Mumbai. Prior to that, a rented six-storey building at S. M. Centre in Andheri, Mumbai served as its headquarters. However this was moved following criticism regarding working conditions.

Livery
It was navy blue with light grey and chrome yellow. The top and bottom of the aircraft were painted in light grey with the flying sun logo in the navy blue background.

In 2007, a new livery was created by Landor Associates which added yellow and gold ribbons; the design retained the dark blue and gold-accented colour scheme along with the airline's "flying sun" logo. A new yellow uniform was simultaneously introduced, created by Italian designer Roberto Capucci. Jet Airways introduced its new identity in conjunction with a global brand re-launch which included new aircraft and seating.

Controversies

Alleged Trademark infringement
Jet Airways was expected to begin service to Newark via Brussels in June 2005. In March 2005, the airline submitted an application to the United States Department of Transportation; however, the application was opposed by Nancy Heckerman, CEO of a US registered company Jet Airways Inc., based in Bethesda, Maryland, alleging trademark infringement and connections to terrorist outfit Al Qaeda. Jet Airways rebuffed the claims, which was tossed out as a frivolous lawsuit.

Safety
Asmin Tariq, a contractor working for the airline as a security agent at Heathrow airport was implicated in the foiled terror plot on 10 August 2006 to blow up several transatlantic airliners belonging to three different US airlines. Subsequently, the Governments of UK and Singapore requested security-related information from the Ministry of External Affairs on Jet Airways; clearance was further delayed to fly to the US. The US State Department gave the go-ahead for the airline to fly to the US on 15 November 2006.

In August 2014, two pilots of Jet Airways were suspended after a plane carrying 280 passengers dropped  mid-air en route from Mumbai to Brussels.

Customer care
On 2 December 2016, Jet Airways flight 9W7083 from Bhopal to Mumbai was held up by a large group of passengers headed for a wedding in Mumbai. There were allegations from other passengers that the wedding party was politically connected and attempted to coerce the cabin crew to disembark passengers so that additional members of their party could be accommodated. The airline claimed it was a technical glitch in their booking system which led to overbooking.

Corruption
In 2016, the airline was implicated in the Gupta family controversy in South Africa when it was alleged by former African National Congress MP Vytjie Mentor that members of the business family had offered her the position of Minister of Public Enterprises, on behalf of President Jacob Zuma, if she agreed to arrange for South African Airways to drop their India route so that Jet Airways could acquire it instead.

Links to organised crime
On 12 December 2001, an internal memo from the Indian intelligence agencies; R&AW and IB (India's Intelligence Agency) to the Indian home ministry stated that they had evidence that Jet Airways had intermittent contact with Dawood Ibrahim, Chota Shakeel and other gangs of the Indian underworld, related to financial transactions. This information was leaked to the media and parliament proceedings were stalled.
Subsequently, in 2016, reports surfaced that the initial investment for Jet Airways itself had come through shell companies from the Isle of Man, and was heavily funded by the Indian underworld. This was documented in detail in the book A Feast of Vultures.

Destinations

As per its website, Jet Airways serves 57 destinations including 37 domestic and 20 international destinations in 15 countries across Asia, Europe, North America and Middle East and other code share destinations. The airline has its primary hub at Mumbai and secondary bases at Delhi and Bangalore. In March 2004, the airline introduced its first international destination, Colombo, with flights connecting to Chennai. London was the airline's first long-haul destination and was launched in 2005. Since 2007, Jet Airways has had a scissors hub at Brussels Airport for onward transatlantic connections to North America, which was replaced by Amsterdam Airport Schiphol from 27 March 2016.

In 2008, the airline was forced to discontinue international routes because these attracted losses due to global economic downturn; it terminated services to San Francisco and Shanghai. The airline planned to restore the Mumbai–Shanghai route by the end of 2011 but never did so. In 2012, the airline withdrew flights to New York City and closed the Delhi–Milan route in 2013. On 1 March 2016, the airline announced the integration of domestic and international operations in Mumbai airport and moved its entire operations to the newly constructed Terminal 2.

Codeshare agreements
Jet Airways had codeshare agreements with the following airlines before ceasing their operations:

 Aeroméxico
 Air Canada
 Air France
 Air Seychelles
 All Nippon Airways
 Bangkok Airways
 China Eastern Airlines
 Delta Air Lines
 Etihad Airways
 Fiji Airways
 Garuda Indonesia
 Hong Kong Airlines
 Jetstar Asia Airways
 Kenya Airways
 KLM
 Korean Air
 Malaysia Airlines
 Qantas
 Vietnam Airlines
 Virgin Atlantic

Fleet

Current fleet

After the airline was grounded due to financial reasons, the Jet Airways fleet consists of the following as of 2022:.

Fleet development
Jet Airways placed its first for four Boeing 737-400 and 30 Boeing 737-800 aircraft on 11 December 1996; and the first aircraft was delivered on 12 November 1997. It placed its second order for six Boeing 737-700 and two Boeing 737-900 aircraft on 14 June 1999 with deliveries starting in May 2001. The airline launched its next round of fleet expansion in 2005 when it ordered 30 Aircraft at the Paris Air Show. The airline signed deals with Airbus for ten A330 aircraft and with Boeing for ten 737 and 777 aircraft each. Long-haul routes were served using its fleet of Airbus A330-200, Airbus A330-300 and Boeing 777-300ER. The airline placed an order for 10 Boeing 777-300ER aircraft on 29 September 2005 which were delivered in 2007. Jet Airways ordered 10 Boeing 787 Dreamliner on 29 December 2006 to operate on long-haul routes. On 5 January 2012, it inducted five ATR 72-600 series to operate on domestic regional routes. It placed a further order for 75 Boeing 737 MAX aircraft on 23 April 2013 as part of modernization of its fleet of 737s. In April 2018 and July 2018 the airline entered an agreement to acquire an additional 75 Boeing 737 MAX aircraft each, taking its order tally to 225 Boeing 737 MAX jets. After Jet Airways ceased their operations, Boeing cancelled all of Jet Airways' remaining 737 MAX 8 orders along with the Boeing 737 MAX 9 and 10 orders and Boeing 787-9 orders due to the financial problems and airline's collapse. As a part of the airline's relaunch, reports have emerged that the airline is in talks with leading aircraft manufacturer Airbus to procure 50 narrow body Airbus A220 aircraft. Some media reports indicates that Jalan-Kalrock is in talks with aircraft OEMs (original equipment manufacturers) to place an order of at least 200 aircraft of a mix of small, medium, and large narrow body jets at the Paris airshow in June 2023 for their growth plan for five years.

Former fleet
Jet Airways operated the following aircraft in the past:

Services

Cabin
Jet Airways had three classes of service: First, Première (Business) and Economy. 
First class was available only in Boeing 777-300ER aircraft. The first class offered private suites; it featured seats convertible to a fully flat bed, personal LCD TVs and in-seat power supply.
Première class was available on long-haul international flights operated by Airbus A330-200 and Boeing 777-300ER aircraft featured recliner seats, fully flat beds with personal LCD TVs and in-seat power. Première class in domestic flights offered recliner seats with larger leg room in a 2-2 configuration.
Economy class on long-haul aircraft had a  seat pitch with a footrest and the cabin was configured in 2-4-2 on the Airbus A330-200 and 3-4-3 on the Boeing 777-300ER. Economy seats on the Airbus A330 and Boeing 777 had a personal  touchscreen LCD TV. Domestic flights operated by Boeing 737 aircraft had Première and Economy classes and the ATR 72 aircraft had an all-economy class configuration. Economy class on Boeing 737 had a  seat pitch with personal LCD behind each seat. Meals were served in economy class until recently. They introduced buy-on-board which was named Jet Bistro.

WiFi
On 1 February 2016, Jet Airways announced the introduction of an in-flight entertainment service for streaming of entertainment content directly to Wi-Fi enabled personal devices of the passengers.

Frequent flyer programme

Intermiles is the airline's frequent-flyer program.

Accidents and incidents
* 1 July 2007: Jet Airways Flight 3307, an ATR 72-212A (registered VT-JCE), flying on the Bhopal-Indore route was involved in an accident caused by bad weather. There were no fatalities amongst the 45 passengers and four crew, but the aircraft was damaged beyond repair and written off.
* 27 December 2016: A Jet Airways Boeing 737-800, registration VT-JBG performing flight 9W-2374 from Goa to Mumbai (India) with 154 passengers and 7 crew, backtracked runway 26, lined up runway 26 and was accelerating the engines for takeoff when the aircraft continued to turn right, the crew rejected takeoff, the aircraft went off the right runway edge almost perpendicular, went over soft ground and across a road and came to a stop with the nose gear collapsed and both engines making ground contact. The aircraft was evacuated, 16 occupants received minor injuries as a result of the evacuation.

See also
 List of airlines of India
 Transport in India

References

External links

 

 
Airlines of India
Airlines established in 1992
Airlines disestablished in 2019
Etihad Airways Partners
Indian brands
Companies based in Mumbai
Indian companies established in 1992
Indian companies disestablished in 2019
1992 establishments in Maharashtra
Companies listed on the National Stock Exchange of India
Companies listed on the Bombay Stock Exchange